The Grand Flambeau is a mountain peak in the Mont Blanc massif of the Alps.

Its summit is one of a number which form part of the mountainous frontier ridge between France and Italy which runs eastwards from Mont Blanc towards the Grandes Jorasses and Mont Dolent. It can be readily accessed from the Torino Hut/Pointe Helbronner, either by its north or southeast ridges, and provides an excellent viewpoint.

To the north, a satellite peak - the Petit Flambeau - rises a small distance above the Géant Glacier.

Climbing 
The Grand Flambeau was first climbed on 20 July 1876 by Henri Cordier, Jacob Anderegg and Kaspar Maurer by means of the mountain's south-east ridge. This route, following the frontier ridge from the Col du Saussure, remains the easiest way to reach the summit and, on the French adjectival climbing scale, is graded at F+/PD-.

References

External links
 Grand Flambeau on French IGN mapping portal
 Grand Flambeau on Google maps

Mountains of the Alps
Mont Blanc massif